Gribov is a village and municipality in Stropkov District in the Prešov Region of north-eastern Slovakia.

History
In historical records the village was first mentioned in 1414.

Geography
The municipality lies at an altitude of 284 meters and covers an area consisting of 7.942 km². It has a population of about 191 people.

References

External links
 
 
https://web.archive.org/web/20071217080336/http://www.statistics.sk/mosmis/eng/run.html

Villages and municipalities in Stropkov District
Šariš